The Arkansas–Texas League was a Minor League Baseball league which operated in three Arkansas and one Texas cities in . The Class D level league had four teams in their lone season. A. J. Kaiser was the president of the league.

History
The Arkansas–Texas League began play in 1906 as a Class D level league with four teams. The Camden Ouachitas of Camden, Arkansas, Hot Springs Vapors of Hot Springs, Arkansas, Pine Bluff Barristers of Pine Bluff, Arkansas and Texarkana Shine-Oners of Texarkana, Texas were the charter members.

On August 25, 1906, Texarkana folded. With three remaining teams, the league folded on August 26, 1906. The Pine Bluff Barristers were in 1st place when the league folded. With a 32-26 record, Pine Bluff was 2.5 games ahead on the 2nd place Camden Ouachitas. In a playoff, Pine Bluff defeated the Hot Springs Vapors 4 games to 1.

Cities represented
Camden Ouachitas (Camden, Arkansas)
Hot Springs Vapors (Hot Springs, Arkansas)
Pine Bluff Barristers (Pine Bluff, Arkansas)
Texarkana Shine-Oners (Texarkana, Texas)

Standings
1906 Arkansas-Texas League
schedule
Texarkana disbanded August 25. The league disbanded August 26. Playoff: Pine Bluff 4 games, Hot Springs 1.

References

External links

Baseball-Reference (Minors)

Defunct minor baseball leagues in the United States
Baseball leagues in Arkansas
Baseball leagues in Texas
Sports leagues established in 1906
Sports leagues disestablished in 1906